Rynalea Whiteman Pena is an American politician and tribal leader serving as a member of the Montana House of Representatives from the 41st district. Elected in November 2020, she assumed office on January 4, 2021.

Early life and education 
Whiteman Pena was raised in Lame Deer, Montana. She earned an associate of arts degree in early childhood education from Chief Dull Knife College.

Career 
Prior to entering politics, Whiteman Pena worked as a transportation manager and tribal president of the Northern Cheyenne Tribe. She was elected to the Montana House of Representatives in November 2020 and assumed office on January 4, 2021, succeeding Rae Peppers.

References 

Living people
People from Rosebud County, Montana
Democratic Party members of the Montana House of Representatives
Native American state legislators in Montana
Women state legislators in Montana
Year of birth missing (living people)
21st-century American women